Bansar Football Club (simply known as Bansar FC) is an Indonesian football club based in Langkat Regency, North Sumatra. They currently compete in the Liga 3 and their homeground is Kebun Bunga Stadium.

References

External links

Football clubs in Indonesia
Football clubs in North Sumatra
Association football clubs established in 2010
2010 establishments in Indonesia